The Senate of the Roman Kingdom was a political institution in the ancient Roman Kingdom. The word senate derives from the Latin word senex, which means "old man". Therefore, senate literally means "board of old men" and translates as "Council of Elders". The prehistoric Indo-Europeans who settled Rome in the centuries before the legendary founding of Rome in 753 BC were structured into tribal communities. These tribal communities often included an aristocratic board of tribal elders, who were vested with supreme authority over their tribe. The early tribes that had settled along the banks of the Tiber eventually aggregated into a loose confederation, and later formed an alliance for protection against invaders.

The early Romans were deeply patriarchal. The early Roman family was called a gens or "clan". Each clan was an aggregation of families under a common living male patriarch, called a pater (the Latin word for "father"). The pater was the undisputed master of his clan. He had the absolute power to resolve any disputes, and to make any decisions for the collective gens. When the early Roman gens were aggregating to form a common community, the patres from the leading clans were selected for the confederated board of elders (what would become the Roman Senate). Legend states that the senate grew to a membership of 300 after three blocks of 100 senators were added at fixed points in time. According to Abbott, however, what likely happened was a gradual aggregation of patres over time, as more clans achieved high status. The early senate derived its ultimate sovereignty from the fact that it was composed of the patriarchal heads of the leading families. As the individual patres led their families, the board of patres led the confederation of those families. In time, the patres came to recognize the need for a single leader. Therefore, they elected a king (rex), and vested in him their sovereign power. The king presided over the senate, appointed individuals to the senate (for life), and expelled individuals from the senate. When the king died, his sovereign power naturally reverted to the patres.

Origin and Development

According to Livy, The senate was created by Rome's first king, Romulus and consisted of 100 men.  The descendants of those 100 men subsequently became the patrician class.

100 more were added to the Senate by Rome's fifth king, Lucius Tarquinius Priscus, from amongst the minor leading families.

Powers of the senate
The senate of the Roman Kingdom could only be convened by the king, and usually met in either a templum, or in some other location that had been consecrated by a religious official (an augur). While the senate could pass "laws", it would be incorrect to view the "laws" passed during the time of the kingdom as legislation. In effect, these "laws" were actually the decrees of the king. The king had the absolute power to make any law. However, he often involved both the senate and the popular assembly (the "Curiate Assembly") in the process. The primary role of the senate in this process was to either assist the king, or to provide additional legitimacy to a decree of the king by declaring its support. Sometimes this involved debate in the senate over the proposed law or an actual vote on the law. However, the king was free to ignore any ruling that the senate ultimately passed. In addition, during the days of the kingdom, the senate's limited prestige made it an accepted practice for the king to ignore advice handed down by the senate. The senate did, however, become an influential advisory council to the king. This tradition was maintained throughout the life of the Roman Republic, although in practice, the republican magistrates rarely acted against the wishes of the senate.

 
The patres that filled the ranks of the early senate held a position of absolute dominance over their respective families. Since the senate was filled with the patres of the leading families, their individual dominance over their individual families was consolidated into collective dominance over the collective families of the early Roman community. These were the original patrician families.

While the king was technically elected by the people, it was actually the senate who chose each new king. Since the consolidated authority of the patres of the senate chose the king, the king became the embodiment of that authority. Since the authority of each pater over his family was absolute, the king was vested with the absolute authority over those families (and thus over the entire state). Since the king derived his authority from the patres, he (theoretically) could not pass that power on to an heir upon his death. Thus, the authority reverted to the senate when the king died.

The period between the death of one king, and the election of a new king, was called the interregnum. The interregnum was the only period during which the senate exercised its sovereign power. During the first interregnum after the death of Romulus, the senate, comprised at that time of 100 men, arranged itself into ten decuries, and each decurio governed Rome for five days as interrex.  The decurios continued to rotate the government amongst themselves for a year until the senate elected Numa Pompilius as king.

The practice eventually evolved that, when a king died, it was a member of the senate (the Interrex) who nominated a candidate to replace the king. If the senate gave its approval, then in practice, the people were unlikely to reject the nominee. The formal election of the king by the people, however, did serve to confirm to the senate that the people (many of whom fought in the armies that were commanded by the king) found their new potential commander-in-chief to be acceptable. After the senate gave its final approval, the Interrex declared the individual king, and then returned to the ranks of the senate. In effect, the senate chose the king, the people ratified that choice, and the senate finalized the decision.

See also

References

 Abbott, Frank Frost (1901). A History and Description of Roman Political Institutions. Elibron Classics.
 Byrd, Robert (1995). The Senate of the Roman Republic. U.S. Government Printing Office, Senate Document 103–23.
 Cicero, Marcus Tullius (1841). The Political Works of Marcus Tullius Cicero: Comprising his Treatise on the Commonwealth; and his Treatise on the Laws. Translated from the original, with Dissertations and Notes in Two Volumes. By Francis Barham, Esq. London: Edmund Spettigue. Vol. 1.
 Lintott, Andrew (1999). The Constitution of the Roman Republic. Oxford University Press.

 Polybius (1823). The General History of Polybius: Translated from the Greek. By James Hampton. Oxford: Printed by W. Baxter. Fifth Edition, Vol 2.
 Taylor, Lily Ross (1966). Roman Voting Assemblies: From the Hannibalic War to the Dictatorship of Caesar. The University of Michigan Press.

Notes

Further reading

 Ihne, Wilhelm. Researches Into the History of the Roman Constitution. William Pickering. 1853. 
 Johnston, Harold Whetstone. Orations and Letters of Cicero: With Historical Introduction, An Outline of the Roman Constitution, Notes, Vocabulary and Index. Scott, Foresman and Company. 1891.
 Mommsen, Theodor. Roman Constitutional Law. 1871-1888
 Tighe, Ambrose. The Development of the Roman Constitution. D. Apple & Co. 1886.
 Von Fritz, Kurt. The Theory of the Mixed Constitution in Antiquity. Columbia University Press, New York. 1975.
 The Histories by Polybius
 Cambridge Ancient History, Volumes 9–13.
 A. Cameron, The Later Roman Empire, (Fontana Press, 1993).
 M. Crawford, The Roman Republic, (Fontana Press, 1978).
 E. S. Gruen, "The Last Generation of the Roman Republic" (U California Press, 1974)
 F. Millar, The Emperor in the Roman World, (Duckworth, 1977, 1992).
 A. Lintott, "The Constitution of the Roman Republic" (Oxford University Press, 1999)

Primary sources
 Cicero's De Re Publica, Book Two
 Rome at the End of the Punic Wars: An Analysis of the Roman Government; by Polybius

Secondary source material
 Considerations on the Causes of the Greatness of the Romans and their Decline, by Montesquieu
 The Roman Constitution to the Time of Cicero
 What a Terrorist Incident in Ancient Rome Can Teach Us

Government of the Kingdom of Rome
Historical legislatures
 
Roman Senate